Burgampahad  (or Borgampad, Burgampadu) is the headquarters of Burgampahad mandal in Bhadradri Kothagudem district of the Indian state of Telangana.

Geography
It has an average elevation of 42 metres (141 ft).

Demographics 

 Census of India, Burgampahad had a population of 10235. The total population constitute, 5078 males and 5157 females with a sex ratio of 1016 females per 1000 males. 970 children are in the age group of 0–6 years, with sex ratio of 925. The average literacy rate stands at 66.03%.

Administrative divisions 
Burgampahad Mandal of Bhadradri Kothagudem district, Telangana. Burgampahd mandal has  Sarapaka town and list of villages as follows:

References

Villages in Bhadradri Kothagudem district
Mandals in Bhadradri Kothagudem district